The southwestern earless skink (Hemiergis initialis)  is a species of skink found in South Australia and Western Australia.

References

Hemiergis
Reptiles described in 1910
Taxa named by Franz Werner